Les Parry (born 3 November 1953) is an English former footballer. He played for Tranmere Rovers as a centre back over 250 times between 1975 and 1983.

He made his debut for Tranmere in an away fixture against Brentford, a 2–0 loss on 9 October 1972. His first career goal came against Chesterfield in 2–1 home win in April 1977.

During the 1977–78 season, Tranmere manager John King selected the same Tranmere Rovers team for 28 consecutive league games – their birthplaces are in brackets: Dickie Johnson (Huyton), Ray Mathias (Liverpool), Eddie Flood (Liverpool), Les Parry (Wallasey), Dave Philpotts (Wirral), Clive Evans (Wirral), Steve Peplow (Liverpool), Mark Palios (Liverpool), Ronnie Moore (Huyton), Bobby Tynan (Liverpool) and Russell Allen (Smethwick). It's considered to be one of the most 'local' teams in Football League history as all players bar one were born within 10 miles of Prenton Park.

In Parry's testimonial year, he was sent off twice. He broke his leg, meaning that he would miss his own testimonial through injury. It took place against Derby County F.C.

His last game for Tranmere was a 1–0 loss against Darlington on 1 December 1983.

Career statistics

Source:

References

1953 births
Living people
English footballers
Tranmere Rovers F.C. players
Association football central defenders
People from Wallasey
English Football League players